The O'ahu Cattlemen's Association Paniolo Hall of Fame, also known as the Hawai'i Paniolo Hall of Fame, is a cowboy hall of fame sponsored by the O'ahu Cattlemen's Association on the island of O'ahu, Hawai'i. Established in 1999, the Paniolo Hall of Fame recognizes individuals "for their contribution to the paniolo heritage and for perpetuating the industry".

Inductees

Inducted 2017
 Henry Perrine (H.P.) Baldwin
 Henry F. Rice
 William Herbert Shipman
 Samuel Alexander "Sam" Baldwin
 Arthur Morgan Brown, III
 Leonard Radcliffe “Rally” Greenwell
 
Inducted 2015
 Glenn Michael Souza
 Thomas Weston Lindsey
 Greg Friel
 Godfrey Kehelelani Kainoa, Sr.
 Charles Kaleoaloha Kahaleauki, Jr.
 Walter Boteilho, Sr.
 Henry Edward "Bud" Gibson
 Henry Lulu Rafael
 Lani Cran Petrie

Inducted 2013
 William Miki Kalaniopio, Sr.
 Johnny Correia, Jr.
 Frank Aola Ke, Sr.
 Francis Napua Poouahi
 Matsuichi Yamaguchi
 Paul Hiwahiwa Kealoha, Sr.
 William F. Jacintho
 George Russell "Keoki" Kealoha, Sr.
 Robert L. "Bobby" Hind, Jr.
 James "Jimmy" Greenwell
 Peter Kalahoolewa Kainoa, Sr.
 Walter "Wala" Stevens

Inducted 2011
 Richard Kaleioku Palmer Smart
 Harry M. "Pono" von Holt
 Alfred Hartwell Carter
 Clarence Medeiros, Sr.
 Gary J. Rapozo
 Naluahine Kaopua
 Donald George "Donnie" Desilva
 Peter Kama, Sr.
 Louis von Tempsky
 Dee Benjamin Gibson

Inducted 2009
 John Wellington Peiper
 James H. Armitage
 Arthur A. Lorenzo
 Tom H. Onaka
 Karin Kawiliau Haleamau
 Richard "Dick" Penhallow
 Charles T. Onaka
 Anna Leialoha Lindsey-Perry-Fiske
 Kenneth "Blackie" Freitas
 Henry Frederick "Oskie" Rice
 Roy Allen Wall, Jr.
 Oliver Lavoy "Whitey" White

Inducted 2007
 Gene "Genny" Olivera
 Robert Hind
 Jerry J. Louis, Sr.
 Peter D. Baldwin
 John Howard Midkiff, Jr.
 Thomas "Tommy" Kaniho
 Carl A. Carlson
 Michael C. "Corky" Bryan
 Robert "Bobby" Milne Napier
 Daniel Alfred Miranda
 Clayton D. Tremaine, Sr.
 Jose "Joe" Correia
 Joseph "Big Joe" Santos

Inducted 2005
 Alfred Medeiros, Jr.
 Robert Kamuela "Sonny" Keakealani, Jr.
 Herman L. Pacheco
 Eben Parker Low
 Joseph Punilei Manini, Sr.
 Charles "Kale" Stevens
 Tony J. Jose
 Jack Ramos
 William "Willy" Kaniho
 John B. Medeiros

Inducted 2003
 Robert Francis Greenwell
 George Paul Cooke
 Alfred Wellington Carter
 Joseph Cordeiro
 Leighton Kaleialii Beck
 Robert Lopaka Keakealani
 Barbara Kamilipua Nobriga
 Gilbert Medeiros, Sr.
 Selwyn Aubrey Robinson
 John Clarence Rapoza
 John Kelekolio Kainoa
 Charles T. Kimura
 Richard H. "Manduke" Baldwin
 Frank Silva
 William H.J. Paris, Jr.

Inducted 2002
 John Pacheco Tavares
 Harold Amoral
 Carl "Soot" Bredhoff
 Jiro Yamaguchi
 Ernest John Morton
 Florence M. Schultz
 Edmund "Ed" Hedemann
 John T. Waterhouse
 Sherwood R.H. Greenwell
 Walter A. Slater
 J. Gordon Cran
 Yoshio Kawamoto
 Joaquin Joseph, Jr.
 Teddy Bell
 Joseph Pacheco
 Edward T. "Eddie" Silva

Inducted 2001
 George Waiwaiole Manoa
 William E. Eby
 James Richard "Casey" DeSilva, Sr.
 Yutaka Kimura
 James M. Greenwell
 William J. Andrade, Sr.
 David “Buddy” Nobriga
 William “Willy” Gomes, Sr.
 Andrew Pine Kauai, Sr.
 Patrick “Paddy” Pauline
 John Palmer Parker, I

Inducted 2000
 Kingo Gushikuma
 Sebastian Reiny
 Herbert M. “Monty” Richards, Jr.
 Joseph Atherton Richards
 Kimo Hoopai, Sr.
 James Moehao Duvauchelle, Sr.
 Harold Frederick Rice, Jr.
 Eddie Taniguchi, Jr.
 Eddie Taniguchi, Sr.
 Francis S. Morgan
 Ronald K. von Holt
 Alexander James Napier

Inducted 1999
 George K. A`I, Sr.
 Ikua Purdy
 David Kaluhiokalani
 Harold Sung Wa Aiu
 Albert Silva
 Martin Knott, Sr.
 Alexander Alika Akau, Sr.
 Dr. Max B. Smith
 Ron Brun
 Masa & Shima Kapahu
 Abraham Akau
 Eddie Rice

Source:

Notes

External links
Honolulu Star-Bulletin website
Hawai'i Cattlemen's Council website

1999 establishments in Hawaii
 
Cowboy halls of fame
Halls of fame in Hawaii
Culture of Oahu
Sports halls of fame
Sports hall of fame inductees
Awards established in 1999
Lists of sports awards